Major General Walter Melville Robertson (June 15, 1888 – November 22, 1954) was a senior United States Army officer. During World War II he received the second highest American military award, Distinguished Service Cross, for his leadership of the 2nd Infantry Division during the Battle of the Bulge in December 1944.

Early military service

Walter Melville Robertson was born on June 15, 1888 in Nelson County, Virginia as the son of William Walter Robertson and his wife Mary Fannie (néé Pettit). He completed the Central State Normal School in Edmond, Oklahoma in summer of 1907, then a preparatory school and subsequently enrolled the University of Oklahoma in Norman, Oklahoma, where he took a special work in engineering. In May 1908, Robertson interrupted his studies, when received an appointment to the United States Military Academy at West Point, New York.

During his time at the Academy, he was nicknamed "Robby" by his classmates and was active in the track team, basketball squad and became an individual tennis champion during his time at the Academy. Robertson rose to the rank of Cadet Captain and graduated on June 12, 1912 with Bachelor of Science degree.

Many of his West Point classmates later became a general officers during World War II. For example: Wade H. Haislip, John Shirley Wood, Walton Walker, Raymond O. Barton, Harry J. Malony, Gilbert R. Cook, Stephen J. Chamberlin, Archibald V. Arnold, Albert E. Brown, Roscoe C. Crawford, William H. Wilbur, Philip R. Faymonville, Bradford G. Chynoweth, Robert M. Littlejohn, Sidney P. Spalding, Franklin C. Sibert, Thomas J. Hayes, William G. Weaver, William H. Hobson, Francis B. Mallon, John E. Lewis, Davenport Johnson, William J. Morrissey or Millard Harmon.

Upon his graduation, three days before his twenty-fourth birthday, Robertson was commissioned as a second lieutenant in the Infantry and ordered to Hawaii, where he joined the 1st Infantry Regiment at Schofield Barracks. He served with that unit until mid-1915, when he was ordered to the Presidio of San Francisco for service with 24th Infantry Regiment.

In early 1916, Robertson was transferred to Fort Missoula, Montana, where he served for few months, before he was ordered to the newly established officer training school at Camp Bullis in Texas. Following the United States entry into World War I in April 1917, he served with the training units, before he embarked for France in May 1918. Robertson participated in combat operations on the Western Front in late 1918 and then took part in the occupation of the Rhineland until February 1920.

Interwar period
Following his return stateside, Robertson was assigned to the Office of the Inspector General of the United States Army under Major general Eli A. Helmick and served in this capacity until May 1924, when he was ordered to the Advanced course at Army Infantry School at Fort Benning, Georgia. He completed the course one year later and entered another course at Army Command and General Staff College at Fort Leavenworth, Kansas.

Robertson graduated in June 1926 and assumed duty as an instructor at the Command and General Staff College. He served in this capacity until July 1929, when he was promoted to Major and ordered to the Army War College in Washington, D.C. for an instruction. Robertson graduated in May 1930 and then served again in the capacity of an instructor at that College until he was ordered for duty in the Philippines.

He was stationed at Fort William McKinley and served as Commanding officer, 2nd Battalion, 31st Infantry Regiment. Robertson was promoted to lieutenant colonel in August 1935 and was ordered back to the United States in June 1936. He then served briefly as Executive officer, 16th Infantry Regiment at Fort Jay, Governors Island, before he was transferred to the War Department General Staff for duty as Executive officer, Logistics Division.

Robertson served four years in that capacity, before he was ordered to the 23rd Infantry Regiment for duty as Executive officer in July 1940. He assumed command of 9th Infantry Regiment in November that year and remained in that capacity until the United States' entry into World War II, following an Attack on Pearl Harbor in December 1941.

World War II

Robertson was promoted to the temporary rank of Brigadier general on December 15, 1941 and ordered to the Louisiana Maneuvers area, where he assumed duty as Assistant Division Commander, 2nd Infantry Division under Major General John C. H. Lee. The Second Division conducted intensive training in order to prepare for combat deployment in Europe for several months, and Robertson relieved Lee in May 1942 when Lee was summoned to Washington by Army Chief of Staff General George C. Marshall to assume command of the Services of Supply, ETO. Robertson was promoted to the temporary rank of Major general on August 17, 1942.

After he assumed command, he led division during the four-month intensive training in winter warfare at Camp McCoy, Wisconsin and embarked for England in October 1943. Robertson then led his division during another period of training in Northern Ireland and Wales and finally deployed to France on Omaha Beach on D-Day plus 1 (June 7, 1944) near Saint-Laurent-sur-Mer.

The Second Division went into its first World War II combat on June 10, 1944 and following the crossing of Aure River, the division liberated Trévières and proceeded to assault and secure Hill 192, a key enemy strong point on the road to Saint-Lô. After three weeks of fortifying the position, General Robertson ordered the assault on Hill 192, which was subsequently captured. After exploiting the Saint-Lo breakout, the 2nd Division then advanced across the Vire to take Tinchebray on August 15, 1944 and then raced toward Brest, the heavily defended port fortress which served as a major port for German U-boats.

Robertson led his division during the Battle for Brest, which lasted for 39 days and was present during the surrender of German garrison on September 19, 1944. The Second division was subsequently ordered to the defensive positions at St. Vith, Belgium, where it remained for two weeks. For his service in Normandy, Robertson received several decorations including Silver Star, Legion of Merit and Bronze Star Medal. He was also decorated with Legion of Honor and Croix de guerre 1939-1945 with Palm by the Government of France.

The German Ardennes offensive in mid-December forced the division to withdraw to defensive positions near Elsenborn Ridge, where the German drive was halted. When the initial thrusts of a full-scale German counter offensive threatened the right flank of his division, Robertson, fully aware of the urgency of the situation, personally assumed command of the defense of a vital road junction to delay the enemy long enough for his troops to take up defensive positions. Within an hour the first hostile tanks appeared 600 yards away and were immediately taken under fire on Robertson's orders. 

Braving intense artillery and direct tank fire, he remained in complete observation of the enemy to supervise the disposition of his troops and to direct the fire of his own tanks and tank destroyers. After two hours of vicious fighting, many German tanks and vehicles were destroyed and the armored thrust in this sector was thwarted. As reinforcements arrived, Robertson proceeded immediately to a second critical area where another salient was threatening two villages along the main route of the enemy advance. He organized troops from his own command and stragglers from elements overrun by the powerful attack and, for a period of seven hours, heroically led them in deterring the advance.

Constantly exposed to intense fire from tanks, machine guns and small arms, Robertson, by his personal direction and his calm and collected demeanor, successfully rallied his men to hold their ground tenaciously. His presence among the foremost elements of his command, his exemplary courage and his self-assurance were primarily responsible for knitting the scattered troops into a cohesive fighting force and checking the forward drive of the enemy spearhead. For his gallant leadership, personal bravery and zealous devotion to duty, Robertson was decorated with Distinguished Service Cross, the second highest military decorations of the United States. The citation for the medal reads:

Robertson was also appointed Honorary Companion of the Order of the Bath or received Order of the Crown, rank Commander and Croix de guerre with Palm by the Government of Belgium.

On March 4, 1945, the division captured Gemünd and reached the Rhine river five days later. Robertson and his division then advanced south to take Breisig, which it seized on March 11, and then participated in the guarding of the Remagen bridge, between March 12–20. He subsequently led his division further to Germany and participated in the capture of Göttingen, Merseburg or Leipzig.

The Second Division then advanced to Czechoslovakia on May 4, 1945 and liberated the city of Pilsen on VE Day. Robertson received Army Distinguished Service Medal for his service with 2nd Infantry Division and also was decorated with Czechoslovak Order of the White Lion, 3rd Class and Czechoslovak War Cross 1939-1945.

Life after the War
In June, 1945, Major General Robertson was transferred to the XV Corps, where he replaced his West Point classmate, Lieutenant General Wade H. Haislip, as a corps commander. He served with the XV Corps as the part of Occupation forces in Austria and then in Germany. In March 1946, XV Corps was inactivated and Robertson was appointed Head of the US Delegation Allied Control Commission for Bulgaria. In this capacity, he led the U.S. team, which participated in the making of recommendations for Bulgaria as the defeated Axis country. Robertson stayed there until September 1947 and received a second Army Distinguished Service Medal for his service in this capacity, the citation for which reads:'

He was subsequently appointed a Deputy Commander of the Sixth Army under the command of General Mark W. Clark with headquarters at Fort Sam Houston, Texas and served in this capacity until his retirement from the army on June 30, 1950.

After retirement, Robertson was appointed a California State Director of Civil Defense with the seat in Sacramento. Robertson's nomination was opposed by unsuccessful gubernatorial candidate and highly decorated Marine officer, James Roosevelt, who described his nomination as nonentity and "no one has ever heard of General Robertson". Fortunately the Governor of California, Earl Warren, defended Robertson's appointment and said Roosevelt's remark that Robertson was a “nonentity” was wholly unjustified and indecent reference to one of the nation's most distinguished soldiers.

While in this position, Robertson was responsible for the administration of air raid shelters and gas masks, preparation of disaster relief plans, evacuation plans or Civil Defense drills. He held that office during the early years of the Cold War and Robertson's main task was to prepare the people of California for the possible atomic bomb attacks.

In October 1954, Robertson was accepted to the Letterman Army Hospital for a minor operation, and it was discovered that he had a serious abdominal condition, for which he submitted to an operation on November 9. Unfortunately post-operative complications followed and Robertson died on November 22, 1954 at the age of 66 years.

He was buried with full military honors at Arlington National Cemetery, Virginia. His honorary pallbearers were his West Point Classmates: Stephen J. Chamberlin, Roscoe C. Crawford, Wade H. Haislip, Robert M. Littlejohn and Sidney P. Spalding. Robertson's wife, Lorene Crebs (1891-1964) is buried beside him.

Decorations

Here is Major General Robertson's ribbon bar:

References

External links

Generals of World War II
United States Army Officers 1939–1945

|-

1888 births
1954 deaths
People from Nelson County, Virginia
University of Oklahoma alumni
United States Military Academy alumni
United States Army Command and General Staff College alumni
United States Army War College alumni
Burials at Arlington National Cemetery
United States Army personnel of World War I
United States Army War College faculty
United States Army Command and General Staff College faculty
United States Army generals
Recipients of the Distinguished Service Cross (United States)
Recipients of the Distinguished Service Medal (US Army)
Recipients of the Silver Star
Recipients of the Legion of Merit
Honorary Companions of the Order of the Bath
Recipients of the Legion of Honour
Recipients of the Croix de Guerre 1939–1945 (France)
Commanders of the Order of the Crown (Belgium)
Recipients of the Croix de guerre (Belgium)
Recipients of the Military Order of the White Lion
Recipients of the Czechoslovak War Cross
United States Army generals of World War II
United States Army Infantry Branch personnel
Military personnel from Virginia